Iballë is an old village and a former municipality in Shkodër County, northern Albania. In 2015 it became a subdivision of the municipality Fushë-Arrëz. The population according to the 2011 census was 1,129. The municipal unit contains several villages: Iballë, Sapaç, Levosh, Berishë e Vogël, Berishë Vendi, Berishë e Eperme, Shopel and Mërtur.

Transportation

Different destinations and road conditions.
 15 km from Fierzë      (Gravel road without maintenance, only for "Off-Roads" cars)
 36 km from Fushë-Arrëz (Paved road, 5m asphalt width)
 10 km from river Drin (It's the same road for going to Fierzë)

References

Former municipalities in Shkodër County
Administrative units of Fushë-Arrëz
Villages in Shkodër County